One Good Friend is the third studio album by Canadian country music artist George Canyon. It is the first album released by Canyon since he competed on Nashville Star 2, and his first release in the United States. In 2005, the album won Canyon a Juno Award for Country Recording of the Year. The album was produced by Steve Mandile of the band Sixwire, who also wrote three of the songs on it, including a co-write with Andy Childs, another member of the band.

Fellow Canadian country musician Paul Brandt sings back-up for the track "Letting Go".

Content
The album's title comes from the track on the song that was pitched to George the day before he began recording. "I immediately thought of my wife Jennifer and had to have it on the album. She is my one good friend."

The album's most well known track, "My Name" co-written by Canyon, was written from the perspective of an unborn baby. "A close friend and his wife had a miscarriage and I witnessed the pain they went through losing a baby. I wanted to write a song to help people cope with that trauma and somehow bring a positive light to the subject." The music video for that song continues the theme.

Track listing

 "Who Would You Be" (Wade Kirby, Bryant Simpson) - 3:05
 "Unfinished" (Kelley Lovelace, Lee Thomas Miller) - 3:52
 "Workin' on Ten" (Randall Keith Brown, Willie Mack, Steve Mandile) - 3:18
 "My Name" (George Canyon, Gordie Sampson) - 4:01
 "I'll Never Do Better Than You" (Clint Daniels, Tony Martin) - 3:18
 "Hell or High Water" (Mandile, Andy Childs, Scott Parker) - 2:47
 "Letting Go" (Canyon, Thom Shepherd) - 4:37
featuring Paul Brandt
 "You're in the Right Place" (Kerry Kurt Phillips, Shane Teeters) - 3:51
 "Bird in December" (Brown, Mack, Mandile) - 3:31
 "One Good Friend" (Jim Collins, Rivers Rutherford) - 2:36

Production
Tony Brown was the executive producer with George Canyon acting as associate producer. All tracks are produced by Tim DuBois and Steve Mandile except for "Workin' on Ten" and "Bird in December", produced by Steve Mandile and Keith Brown and "Hell or High Water", produced solely by Steve Mandile.

Personnel
As listed in liner notes.
Eddie Bayers - drums
Paul Brandt - background vocals on "Letting Go"
Mike Brignardello - bass guitar
George Canyon - lead and background vocals
Stuart Duncan - fiddle
Paul Franklin - steel guitar, dobro, slide guitar
Steve Gibson - acoustic guitar
John Howard - bass guitar
Steve Mandile - electric and acoustic guitars, keyboards, percussion, background vocals
Brent Mason - electric guitar
Steve Nathan - piano, keyboards, B3 organ, Wurlitzer
Russ Pahl - steel guitar
Michael Rhodes - bass guitar
Chuck Tilley - drums
Dennis Wage - keyboards
Jonathan Yudkin - violin, cello, fiddle

Chart performance

References

2004 albums
George Canyon albums
Albums produced by Tony Brown (record producer)
Show Dog-Universal Music albums
Juno Award for Country Album of the Year albums